Glitch Mode is the second studio album by South Korean boy band NCT Dream, released on March 28, 2022, by SM Entertainment through Dreamus. Following their previous album Hot Sauce and its repackaged version Hello Future, Glitch Mode is NCT Dream's second record to feature seven members after Mark's return to the lineup and the termination of their age-based graduation system. The repackaged version of the album, Beatbox, features four new tracks, including the lead single of the same name, and was released on May 30.

Glitch Mode is a R&B, pop and hip hop record containing eleven tracks that evoke a "comforting" atmosphere. It was commercially successful in South Korea, debuting at number one on the monthly Gaon Chart with 1,646,949 copies sold. In the United States, the album became NCT Dream's first entry on the Billboard 200, debuting at number 50.

Background 
Glitch Mode came nine months after NCT Dream released their first studio album Hot Sauce, which was met with commercial and critical success, and its reissue Hello Future. In January 2022, SM Entertainment confirmed in a statement to the South-Korean newspaper MyDaily that NCT Dream would release a new album in March. Glitch Mode is NCT Dream's second album to feature a seven-member lineup following Mark's return and the termination of the age-based graduation system.

Composition and concept 
Glitch Mode is a R&B, pop and hip hop record. On it, NCT Dream strays further away from their original "high-teen" concept and bubblegum pop music in favor of a more "mature" image and hip hop sound. While the album opens with more "experimental", "loud" and "animated" tracks, it mainly comprises "fairly lowkey" songs. During the Glitch Mode press conference, Mark stated that through the album and lead single of the same name, they wanted to express how "everyone's abnormal". He revealed that the Korean crime-comedy film Attack the Gas Station heavily inspired the album and music video for the lead single, saying that the concept "popped in my mind after listening to 'Glitch Mode'".

Songs  
The opening track, "Fire Alarm", speaks of NCT Dream's ambition to surprise the world and features an "energetic" chorus, which incorporates a clapping sample and a siren sound refers to the film Attack the Gas Station. The lead single, "Glitch Mode", is a hip hop dance song featuring a rock guitar interlude that contrasts an introductory narration with a "dynamic" 808 bass and chanting chorus. Its lyrics, with rap verses co-written by Mark, express how someone freezes "as if buffering" when they see someone they like. "Arcade" is a hip hop dance song with "powerful" beat, whose lyrics follow arcade game motifs and project a message of confidence. A mid-tempo pop song, "It's Yours" is anchored by bass and electric guitar, as well as rap verses written by members Mark, Jeno, Jaemin and Jisung. "Teddy Bear" is an R&B pop ballad focusing on the members' "sweet" voices. "Replay" is a mid-tempo R&B pop song that combines instrumentation ranging from old-school instruments to hi-fi synths and deep bass. Mark, Jeno, and Jisung participated in writing the lyrics, which express longing for happy moments after a breakup. Performed by Mark, Jeno, Jaemin and Jisung, "Saturday Drip" is a '90s hip hop-inspired track with repeating synths and rap flow that depicts a Saturday night. "Better Than Gold" is a synth-pop song with a funky rhythm and upbeat bass line. Its lyrics express how moments spent together are "more precious than gold". With lyrics intended to comfort those who are struggling and weary, the production of "Drive" centers on acoustic piano and guitars. "Never Goodbye" is an R&B ballad that combines "restrained" percussion with a "gentle" Rhodes keyboard and chimes. It conveys the sentiment of "always waiting in the same place", much like the North Star. Mark, Jeno, Jaemin and Jisung each interpreted the concept differently while writing the lyrics, resulting in different ideas shining throughout the song. The final track of the album, "Rewind", is a "lively" mid-tempo R&B pop song with a light beat. The lyrics reminisce the memories the group members have shared, conveying their desire to stay together forever as "7Dream".

The repackaged version of the album features four additional tracks: "Beatbox", "To My First", "Sorry, Heart" and "On the way". Lead single "Beatbox" is an old-school hip hop dance song featuring beatboxing samples. "To My First", the fourth installment of NCT Dream's "love series", is a R&B pop song that incorporates electric guitar. Following its predecessors "My First And Last", "Bye My First..." and "Love Again", the song's lyrics contain a final goodbye to a first love after learning what love is through life experiences. Sung by members Renjun, Haechan and Chenle, "Sorry, Heart" features jazz guitar and lyrics about feelings of regret towards the person that one loves. "On the way" is a R&B pop song with synth keyboards and lyrics that express the members' desire to always be together.

Release and promotion 
On February 28, after SM Entertainment confirmed a March release window for NCT Dream, the album title Glitch Mode, written in different "old-school computer-themed" fonts and colors, was revealed in a video teaser. On the same day, SM announced the release date and opened pre-orders. Beginning on March 14, SM released five sets of photo teasers, in which the members were depicted wearing different outfits, from black suits with futuristic bike helmets to hot pink outfits, in various locations, including an abandoned house and a gas station, to convey the "unusual charms" of the lead single "Glitch Mode", whose concept centers around "errors". The images were accompanied by a set of video teasers with a glitch effect featuring individual members. On March 25, NCT Dream teased all eleven tracks with a mashup video uploaded to the group's social media platforms. Glitch Mode was officially released on March 28, alongside a music video for the lead single.

The group held two live broadcasts on YouTube on March 28 and 30 to celebrate the release, where they performed "Glitch Mode" for the first time. From March 31, they performed "Glitch Mode" alongside the b-side "Arcade" on various South Korean music shows, including M Countdown, Music Bank, Inkigayo, Show Champion and Show! Music Core. However, Chenle had to limit his participation in the stages due to an ankle injury. On April 14, they performed the B-side track "Never Goodbye" on M Countdown as a gift to fans. On March 7, SM announced NCT Dream would hold their second online concert, "Dream Stage: Glitch Mode", in support of the album on April 5.

On May 9, SM Entertainment confirmed that the repackaged version of the album, titled Beatbox, would be released on May 30. The repackage version of the album uses packaging certified by the Forest Stewardship Council and was made with environmentally friendly techniques and materials, such as UV coating and soy ink. It consists of two versions, the photobook version and the digipack version, which was created with the help of the members, who contributed in designing the album cover, CD, and booklet. Starting on May 14, teaser images were released through the group's social media platforms. On May 30, Beatbox was released alongside a music video for the lead single of the same name.

The group held two live broadcasts on various social media platforms on May 30 and 31 to talk about the record. To promote the release, the group planned to perform the lead single "Beatbox" on the Japanese television show Venue 101 and on various South Korean music shows, including M Countdown, Music Bank, Inkigayo and Show! Music Core. However, on June 3 it was announced the group would halt all remaining activities since members Jeno and Chenle had tested positive for COVID-19.

Pop-up store 
A pop-up store in Seongsu-dong, Seoul opened from April 1 to May 29 to commemorate the release of Glitch Mode. The arcade-themed store included a photo zone that reproduced the music videos's shooting location and an entertainment zone with 8-bit games inspired by the album artwork. Other products and attractions included balloons with the members' signatures and handwritten letters. The store recorded an average of 500 visitors a day and attracted a total of 46,000 people over the course of two months.

The Dream Show 2: In A Dream

Critical reception 

Rhian Daly of NME said that Glitch Mode "feels like a balancing act", where "fairly lowkey" tracks are alternated with NCT Dream's typical experimental songs. She commented positively on the album's more "animated" tracks, while she noted that tracks like "It's Yours" and "Drive" are not memorable. Conversely, Jung Soo-min of IZM wrote that the first half of the album doesn't express the "individuality" of NCT Dream, while she commented positively on the "nostalgic" second half of the album and highlighted songs like "Better Than Gold" and "Drive". Jung thought the album was not on par with Hot Sauce due to "the obsession" with the "neo" concept that has been established for all NCT units, since it doesn't allow NCT Dream to explore more "hopeful" themes, which she believes are the group's strong suit. The album was featured in Times list "The Best K-pop Songs and Albums of 2022 So Far".

Commercial performance 
Glitch Mode surpassed 2.03 million pre-orders on the day of release, the second-highest ever for an act under SM and exceeding NCT Dream's previous career high of 1.71 million pre-orders for Hot Sauce. The album sold 700,000 copies on its first day after release. As of April 3, Glitch Mode recorded sales of 2,100,339 copies within one week, breaking the group's previous personal record of two million copies sold in 16 days for Hot Sauce. On the day of its release, it was announced that Beatbox surpassed 1.4 million pre-orders. On June 13, 2022, it was reported that Beatbox had sold 1.52 million copies. Combining Glitch Mode and Beatbox, the album has sold 3.61 million copies.

Glitch Mode debuted at number 50 on the US Billboard 200 dated April 9, 2022, having sold 15,000 album-equivalent units, becoming NCT Dream's first entry on the chart, as well as number two on the Billboard World Albums chart.

Accolades
Glitch Mode won the Album Bonsang at the 37th Golden Disc Awards. It won Album of the Year at the Genie Music Awards, an award show which selects its winners mainly based on the chart data gathered from the Genie Music platform. NCT Dream also won Singer of the Year at the ceremony, earning two out of the three daesang that were awarded. The result was contested, since the group won over South Korean trot singer Lim Young-woong, one of the best selling digital artists of the year. The public raised concerns over SM Entertainment's possible involvement, as the company was already caught up in a similar controversy in 2018 and 2019. Writing for Sisa Journal, cultural critic Ha Jae-geun commented that "there's still a long way to go" to restore awards ceremonies' credibility.

Track listing

Charts

Weekly charts

Monthly charts

Year-end charts

Certifications and sales

Release history

See also 
 List of best-selling albums in South Korea
 List of Gaon Album Chart number ones of 2022

Notes

References 

2022 albums
Korean-language albums
NCT Dream albums
SM Entertainment albums
Universal Music Group albums